Lake Jackson may refer to:

Lakes in the United States
 Lake Jackson (Leon County, Florida)
 Lake Jackson Mounds Archaeological State Park
 Lake Jackson (Sebring, Florida)
 Lake Jackson (Georgia)

Cities or towns in the United States
 Lake Jackson, Texas
 Lake Jackson, Virginia, which is situated on a reservoir called Lake Jackson

See also
 Jackson Lake (disambiguation)
 Jackson Lake State Park (disambiguation), multiple parks
 Little Lake Jackson, Sebring, Florida
 Lake Jacksonville, Texas
 Lake Jacksonville (Illinois)